Abandon Creek is a stream in the U.S. state of Idaho. It is a tributary of Caribou Creek.

Abandon Creek was named because of its isolated location.

Variant names
According to the Geographic Names Information System, it has also been known historically as:
Caribou Creek

See also
List of rivers of Idaho

References

Rivers of Boundary County, Idaho
Rivers of Idaho